Susilo Bambang Yudhoyono (born 9 September 1949), commonly referred to by his initials SBY, is an Indonesian politician and retired army general who served as the sixth president of Indonesia from 2004 to 2014. A member of the Democratic Party of Indonesia, he served as the 4th leader of the Democratic Party from 2014 until 2020, 8th and 10th coordinating minister of politics and security affairs of Indonesia from 2000 until 2001, and again from 2001 until 2004. He also served as the president of the Assembly and chair of the Council of the Global Green Growth Institute. He was also the former chairman of ASEAN due to Indonesia's hosting of the 18th and 19th ASEAN Summits.

Yudhoyono won the 2004 presidential election—the first direct presidential election in Indonesia, defeating incumbent president Megawati Sukarnoputri. He was sworn into office on 20 October 2004, together with Jusuf Kalla as vice-president. He ran for re-election in 2009 with Boediono as his running mate, and won with an outright majority of the votes in the first round of balloting; he was sworn in for a second term on 20 October 2009.

Susilo Bambang Yudhoyono is the recipient of the Lifetime Achievement Award (Champions of the Earth) in 2014.

Name
The name Susilo Bambang Yudhoyono is of Javanese origins, with Sanskrit roots. Susilo comes from the words su-, meaning good and -sila, meaning behaviour, conduct or moral. Bambang is a traditional male name in Javanese, meaning knight. While Yudhoyono comes from the words yuddha -meaning battle, fight; and yana, meaning journey. Thus his full name roughly translates to "well behaved knight on a war mission".

Early life, family, and education

Early life and family 
Susilo Bambang Yudhoyono was born on 9 September 1949, in Tremas, a village in Arjosari, Pacitan Regency, East Java, to a lower-middle-class family. His father was a Javanese man named Raden Soekotjo, whose lineage can be traced to Hamengkubuwono II, while his mother was a Javanese woman named Siti Habibah.

Education 
Yudhoyono had wanted to join the army since he was a child. In school, he developed a reputation as an academic achiever, excelling in writing poems, short stories, and play-acting. Yudhoyono was also talented in music and sport, reflected when he and his friends established a volleyball club called Klub Rajawali and a band called Gaya Teruna.

When he was in fifth grade, Yudhoyono visited the Indonesian Armed Forces Academy (AKABRI). After seeing the soldiers training there and perhaps inspired by his own father's career, Yudhoyono became determined to join the Indonesian Armed Forces and become a soldier. Yudhoyono planned to enlist after graduating from high school in 1968; however, he missed the registration period.

Young Yudhoyono then became a student under the Department of Mechanical Engineering at the Institut Teknologi Sepuluh Nopember (ITS) in Surabaya before entering the Vocational Education Development Center in Malang, East Java. There, he was able to prepare everything for the next phase of his education at the military academy AKABRI. Yudhoyono officially entered AKABRI in 1970 after passing the test in Bandung.

Yudhoyono also studied in the United States, where he received his master's degree in Business Management from Webster University in 1991. He subsequently earned PhD in agricultural economics from the Bogor Agricultural University on 3 October 2004, two days before his presidential victory was announced. His dissertation was entitled "The Rural and Agricultural Development as an Effort to Alleviate Poverty and Unemployment: a political economic analysis of fiscal policy". He was also awarded two honorary doctorates in 2005 in the fields, respectively, of law from his alma mater, Webster University, and in political science from Thammasat University in Thailand. On 12 June 2014, he earned professor degree from Defense University of Indonesia in National Defense Science.

Military service

Military academy 

Yudhoyono spent three years at AKABRI and became the commander of the Cadet Corps Division there. He graduated from AKABRI as second lieutenant in 1973, and as the best graduate of the year, received the prestigious Adhi Makayasa medal from President Suharto.

Kostrad 
After graduating, Yudhoyono joined the Army Strategic Reserve (Kostrad) and became a platoon commander in the 330th Airborne Battalion. Aside from leading his troops, Yudhoyono was also tasked with giving the battalion soldiers lessons on general knowledge and English. Yudhoyono's proficiency in English was one of the reasons why he was sent to the United States to undertake the Airborne and Ranger Courses at Fort Benning in 1975.

Yudhoyono returned to Indonesia in 1976, where he became a platoon commander in the 305th Battalion and was assigned to Indonesian-occupied East Timor. Yudhoyono had several tours of duty and, like many other Indonesian officers involved in the occupation of East Timor, was accused of committing war crimes. However, Yudhoyono has never been charged with any specific act. From East Timor, Yudhoyono became a mortar platoon commander in 1977, an operations officer for an airborne brigade from 1977 to 1978, and a company commander at Kostrad from 1979 to 1981. Yudhoyono then spent 1981 and 1982 working at the Army headquarters.

While working at the Army headquarters, Yudhoyono was sent to the United States again, this time to participate in the Infantry Officer Advanced Course at Fort Benning and in training with the 82nd Airborne Division. Yudhoyono also spent time in Panama and went through the jungle warfare school. When Yudhoyono returned in 1983, he was made commander of the Infantry Trainers' School. It was not long before he was abroad again, this time to Belgium and West Germany, to undertake the Antitank weapons Course. In 1985, Yudhoyono also took a Battalion Commando Course in Malaysia.

From 1986 to 1988, Yudhoyono served with Kodam IX/Udayana, which covers Bali and the Lesser Sunda Islands. Yudhoyono was a battalion commander from 1986 to 1988 and was part of the operational staff in 1988. In 1989, Yudhoyono became a lecturer at the Army Staff College (Seskoad) and delivered a presentation entitled "ABRI's Professionalism at the Present and in the Future". Together with Agus Wirahadikusumah, Yudhoyono published a book entitled "The Challenges of Development".

Whilst at Seskoad, Yudhoyono also took the opportunity to further his own military education. He went to the US Army Command and General Staff College at Fort Leavenworth, Kansas. While in the United States, he took the opportunity to obtain an MA degree in business management from Webster University in 1991.

In 1992, Yudhoyono was transferred to the Army Information Department and worked as a speechwriter for General Edi Sudrajat, the Army chief of staff. In 1993, when Edi became commander of the Military of Indonesia (ABRI), Yudhoyono joined Edi's personal staff. Edi did not last long as ABRI commander and Yudhoyono was then transferred back to Kostrad where he became a brigade commander. A year later, Yudhoyono was the operations assistant at Jaya (Jakarta) Military Area Command before taking command IV/Diponegoro Military Area Command in Central Java. Yudhoyono had one more stint overseas when he became Indonesia's chief military observer of the United Nation Peacekeeping Force in Bosnia in 1995–96.

When Yudhoyono returned to Indonesia, he was made KODAM Jaya chief of staff before being appointed as KODAM II/Sriwijaya commander. In this position, Yudhoyono was responsible for military operations in southern Sumatra. He served in this position until 1997, when he was appointed chief of staff for social-political affairs. At the same time, he was also appointed chairman of the ABRI Faction in the People's Consultative Assembly General Session and participated in Suharto's election to a seventh term as president.

Suharto's resignation 

During the days which would lead to Suharto's resignation in May 1998, Yudhoyono and pro-reform ABRI officers conducted meetings and discussions with Nurcholish Madjid, a secular pro-reform Muslim leader. From his discussions, Yudhoyono accepted the fact that Suharto should resign but like the ABRI officers who went to the meeting with him, was reluctant to withdraw their support of Suharto publicly, much less ask for Suharto's resignation. Nevertheless, the pressure would eventually become too much for Suharto, who resigned on 21 May 1998.

As Indonesia entered the reform era, ABRI's popularity, because of its association with Suharto, was at an all-time low. To de-emphasise ABRI's political role, Yudhoyono's chief of staff for social-political affairs was renamed chief of staff for territorial affairs and in 1999, ABRI was renamed TNI and the Indonesian National Police (Polri) was split off. At this time, Yudhoyono's popularity began to increase as he offered ideas and concepts to reform the military and nation. He did this by combining the strong reformist sentiment of the time with TNI's concern for security and stability. Because of his high education (finishing his doctorate during the course of the presidential elections) and his well planned manoeuvres, Yudhoyono came to be known as "the thinking general".

Political career

Wahid presidency 
Yudhoyono was appointed mining and energy minister in the cabinet of President Abdurrahman Wahid in 1999. According to General Wiranto, who assisted Wahid in the formation of the Cabinet, he had recommended to the president that Yudhoyono would do better as Army chief of staff. However, Wahid rejected the idea and Yudhoyono became the minister of mining and energy instead. At the same time, Yudhoyono ended his military career with the rank of lieutenant general, although he would be made honorary general in 2000.

Yudhoyono's popularity grew, even as minister of mining and energy. In June 2000, there were rumours that Wahid, because of his lack of skill as an administrator was going to appoint a first minister to look after the day-to-day running of the government. Yudhoyono's name appeared as a potential candidate for the position, although eventually Wahid appointed Vice-President Megawati Sukarnoputri as the day to day administrator.

In August 2000, after a Cabinet reshuffle, Yudhoyono became the coordinating minister for politic and security affairs. One of his tasks was to separate the army from politics. This was in line with his reformist ideas on the future of Indonesian military, and is a view he has held since his days in an army policy center. He said at that time:

Another task that Yudhoyono was given was as an intermediary between Wahid and the Suharto family. At the time, Wahid was trying to make Suharto hand back all the money which he had allegedly obtained through corruption when he was president.  Yudhoyono was sent by Wahid to convey this wish and to negotiate with the former first family. However, Yudhoyono was not successful in this venture.

At the beginning of 2001, with political pressure increasing on him, Wahid ordered Yudhoyono to form a crisis centre with Yudhoyono as chairman The purpose of this crisis centre was to assist the president in giving policy advice and was headquartered at Yudhoyono's office. It seemed as if because of this appointment, Yudhoyono could be considered one of Wahid's men, however Yudhoyono would break ranks from Wahid in July 2001 when the latter was facing impeachment. In desperation, Wahid issued a decree freezing the People's Representative Council (DPR) and then asked Yudhoyono to declare a state of emergency to further strengthen his position. Yudhoyono refused to accept this, and Wahid dismissed him.

Megawati presidency
On 23 July 2001, in a special session, the MPR impeached Wahid and replaced him with Megawati as president. A few days later when the MPR assembled to elect a new vice-president, Yudhoyono threw his name in the hat and competed against Golkar's Akbar Tanjung and United Development Party's (PPP) Hamzah Haz. Yudhoyono and Akbar lost out to Hamzah who became the vice-president.

Yudhoyono was appointed to his old position of coordinating minister of political and security affairs in Megawati's new cabinet. After the October 2002 Bali bombing, he oversaw the hunt for and arrest of those responsible, and gained a reputation both in Indonesia and abroad as one of the few Indonesian politicians serious about the War on Terrorism. His speech during the one-year anniversary of the Bali bombing (in which many Australians were killed) was praised by the Australian media and public.

Yudhoyono also dealt with the Free Aceh Movement (GAM), a separatist movement wanting to separate the Province of Aceh from Indonesia. On his advice, Megawati declared martial law in Aceh on 19 May 2003. This martial law was then extended in November 2003.

The Democratic Party
Yudhoyono's supporters saw Yudhoyono's participation in the vice-presidential election as a sign of his popularity and recognised Yudhoyono's potential as a possible leader for Indonesia. One of these supporters, Vence Rumangkang approached Yudhoyono with the idea of forming a political party to help shore up support for the 2004 presidential elections. Yudhoyono approved of the idea and after going through the basic concepts, left Rumangkang in charge of forming the Party.

From 12–19 August 2001, Rumangkang began holding a series of meetings to discuss the formation of the party while holding consultations with Yudhoyono. Yudhoyono personally led the meetings on 19 and 20 August 2001, and the basic outline of the Democratic Party was finalised.

On 9 September 2001, the formation of the party was officially declared and on 10 September it was registered at the Ministry of Justice and Human Rights.

The organizers behind Democratic Party's formation went to extreme lengths to make sure that PD was Yudhoyono's personal political party. The declaration of its formation was 9 September 2001, which was Yudhoyono's birthday and to start off with, the Party had 99 members.

Road to presidency

The United Democratic Nationhood Party (PPDK) was the first to bring up the subject of nomination. In September 2003, Yudhoyono's own party began to make preparations in case Yudhoyono was willing to accept a presidential nomination. The Democratic Party then initiated a publicity campaign to promote Yudhoyono as a candidate. For his part, Yudhoyono was not responsive both to PPDK or the Democratic Party's manoeuvrings to nominate him and continued his duties as minister. PPDK was disappointed in Yudhoyono's reaction and the Democratic Party continued to wait for Yudhoyono to resign his position as was expected of all presidential candidates apart from the incumbent president and vice-president.

The turning point came on 1 March 2004, when Yudhoyono's secretary, Sudi Silalahi announced to the media that for the last six months, Yudhoyono had been excluded from policy decision-making in the field of politics and security. On 2 March 2004, Megawati responded that she had never excluded Yudhoyono, while her husband, Taufiq Kiemas called Yudhoyono childish for complaining to the media instead of the president herself. On 8 March 2004, Yudhoyono sent a letter asking for permission to meet the president about his ministerial authority. Megawati did not respond when she received the letter, although she invited Yudhoyono along to a cabinet meeting on 11 March 2004. Yudhoyono did not attend the cabinet meeting and instead held a press conference at his office and announced his resignation from the position of coordinating minister of political and security affairs. He also announced that he was ready to be nominated as a presidential candidate.

Yudhoyono's popularity skyrocketed after his falling out with Megawati as he was seen by the people as the underdog. However this popularity did not translate to a victory for the Democratic Party at the 2004 legislative elections. The party won 7.5% of the votes, which was still enough to nominate Yudhoyono as a presidential candidate. Yudhoyono accepted the nomination and picked Golkar's Jusuf Kalla as his running mate. Aside from the Democratic Party, their presidential and vice-presidential candidacy was supported by the Crescent Star Party (PBB), the Reform Star Party (PBR) and the Indonesian Justice and Unity Party (PKPI).

Yudhoyono's manifesto for the future of Indonesia, summarised in a book titled "Vision For Change" written by him and distributed for free during the campaign, was built on four pillars: prosperity, peace, justice and democracy. At the top of his agenda was a plan for increasing economic prosperity, aiming for economic growth of at least 7% and a revival of small and medium-sized enterprises. He also put forward policies to offer better credit lines, to cut red tape, improve labour laws and to root out corruption from the top down. He told an interviewer:

Yudhoyono's perceived communication skills made him the front-runner throughout the election campaign, according to many opinion polls and the opinions of election commentators, ahead of the other candidates (Megawati, Wiranto, Amien Rais, and Hamzah). On 5 July 2004, Yudhoyono participated in the first round of the presidential election, coming first with 33% of the votes. However, 50% of votes were required for a new president and vice-president to be elected, and this meant Yudhoyono going into a run-off against Megawati.

In the run-off, Yudhoyono faced a challenge from Megawati's Indonesian Democratic Party-Struggle (PDI-P), forming a national coalition with Golkar, the PPP, Prosperous Peace Party (PDS) and the Indonesian National Party (PNI). Yudhoyono then declared that his coalition, which now received political support from the National Awakening Party (PKB), the Prosperous Justice Party (PKS) and the National Mandate Party (PAN), would be the people's coalition. On 20 September 2004, Yudhoyono participated in the run-off election, winning it with 60.87% of the vote. Yudhoyono was inaugurated as president on 20 October 2004. In February 2010, SBY was named as the political figure who had achieved  by the influential Public Affairs Asia network and magazine.

Presidency: 2004–2014

Cabinet
Presidential elections were held in Indonesia on 8 July 2004. President Susilo Bambang Yudhoyono won more than 60% (60.08%) of the vote in the first round, which enabled him to secure re-election without a run-off. Yudhoyono was officially declared the victor of the election on 23 July 2009, by the General Election Commission. Other candidates are Megawati Sukarnoputri PDI-P Party 26.79%, Jusuf Kalla Golkar Party 12.41%.
The day of his inauguration in 2004, Yudhoyono announced his new cabinet, which would be known as the United Indonesia Cabinet (Kabinet Indonesia Bersatu). Consisting of 36 ministers, it included members of the Democratic Party, Golkar and the PPP, PBB, PKB, PAN, PKP, and PKS. Professionals were also named in the cabinet, most of them taking on ministries in the economic field. The military were also included, with five former members appointed to the cabinet. As Yudhoyono's promised during the election, four of the cabinet appointees were female. Yudhoyono's Second United Indonesia Cabinet was announced in October 2009 after he was re-elected as president earlier in the year. The vice-president in Yudhoyono's second cabinet was Dr. Boediono. Boediono replaced Jusuf Kalla who was vice-president in the first Yudhoyono cabinet.

Balance of power with Vice-President Kalla
Although he had won the presidency, Yudhoyono was still weak in the Indonesian parliament, the People's Representative Council (DPR). The Democratic Party, even combined with all of its coalition partners, had far fewer representatives than Golkar and the PDI-P, which played the role of opposition.

With a national congress to be held in December 2004, Yudhoyono and Kalla had originally backed Agung Laksono speaker to become Golkar chairman. When Agung was perceived to be too weak to run against Akbar Tanjung, Yudhoyono and Kalla threw their weight behind Surya Paloh. Finally, when Paloh was perceived to be too weak to run against Akbar, Yudhoyono gave the green light for Kalla to run for the Golkar Chairmanship. On 19 December 2004, Kalla was elected as the new chairman of Golkar.

Kalla's victory posed a dilemma for Yudhoyono. Although it now enabled Yudhoyono to pass legislation, Kalla's new position meant that he was now more powerful than Yudhoyono in terms of influence in parliament.

After the 2004 Indian Ocean tsunami Kalla, apparently on his own initiative, assembled Ministers and signed a vice-presidential decree ordering work to begin on rehabilitating Aceh. The legality of his vice-presidential decree was questioned although Yudhoyono maintained that it was he who gave the orders for Kalla to proceed.

In September 2005, when Yudhoyono went to New York City to attend the annual United Nations Summit, he left Vice-President Kalla in charge. Yudhoyono held a video conference from New York to receive reports from ministers. Critics suggest that this was an expression of distrust by Yudhoyono. The suggestion seemed to gain momentum when Kalla only showed up for one video conference and then spent the rest of the time taking care of Golkar matters.

To defuse political tensions in the country with the increase in fuel prices, a number of national figures met including former presidents Abdurahman Wahid and Megawati Soekarnoputri to defuse the atmosphere. President Yudhoyono sent Vice President Jusuf Kalla to meet with these national figures. After previously keeping in touch with former President Megawati Soekarnoputri, Vice President M Jusuf Kalla also held a meeting with former President KH Abdurrahman Wahid (Gus Dur). The arrival of Vice President Jusuf Kalla at Gus Dur's residence Jl. Warung Silah Ciganjur, Jakarta, Saturday night was greeted directly by Yenny Wahid on the terrace of the house. Jusuf Kalla, wearing a long-sleeved batik shirt, immediately entered the living room where Gus Dur had been sitting waiting. After shaking hands and hugging each other, Vice President Jusuf Kalla sat on the left side of Gus Dur in a long chair with Mrs. Mufidah. Meanwhile, Mrs. Sinta Nuriyah sat beside Yenny Wahid. The conversation was immediately warm, punctuated by Gus Dur's typical jokes.

Previously, Vice President Jusuf Kalla also kept in touch with former President Megawati Soekarnoputri at the residence on Jl Teuku Umar Jakarta, Saturday. "Leaders must remain friendly both when they are in office and after they are no longer in office," said the Vice President when meeting Megawati. According to the Vice President, his visit to Mrs. Megawati's residence aside from keeping in touch, in the context of Halal bi Halal Eid 1428 H, also provided education to the Indonesian people in order to eliminate mutual grudges. So far, he added, it seems as if there is a habit among officials that if they are no longer in power, they are no longer willing to communicate. The arrival of Vice President Jusuf Kalla to the residence of former President Megawati Soekarnoputri was the first time. Jusuf Kalla in particular came to the residence of Former President Megawati Soekarnoputri on Jl Teuku Umar Jakarta, Saturday for a friendly and halal bi halal 1428 H. The arrival of Vice President M Jusuf Kalla was welcomed by former President Megawati Soekarnoputri along with Taufiq Kiemas and his daughter Puan Maharani. After shaking hands with Vice President Jusuf Kalla, Megawati a few moments later went inside. For a few minutes, it turned out that Megawati came back into the living room and met with Vice President Jusuf Kalla and Mufidah's mother, who were sitting side by side with Puan Maharani. On that occasion the two leaders had a casual chat. Megawati had time to talk about food. Meanwhile, the Vice President responded intimately, resulting in very warm communication. The gathering of about 15 minutes gave the impression that there was never any difference between the two leaders.

Dealings with Suharto
On 6 May 2005, Yudhoyono visited Suharto at hospital when the latter suffered from intestinal bleeding. On 5 January 2007, Yudhoyono and his wife visited Suharto, who was again hospitalised due to anaemia as well as heart and kidney problems. After the visit, Yudhoyono made an appeal to all Indonesians to pray for Suharto's recovery.

Responding to some public requests for Suharto to be granted a pardon for possible past mistakes in governing Indonesia, presidential spokesperson Andi Mallarangeng said, "A visit from an incumbent president to a hospitalized former president is something normal. However, this show of humanity and legal steps are two different things."

Foreign policy
In the foreign policy carried out by President Yudhoyono, there are several policies that can change or produce new breakthroughs for the strategic development of Indonesia's defense, namely ending the US military embargo. The Bush administration claims that ending the arms embargo and modernizing the Indonesian Defence Force will help Jakarta address mutual security concerns such as terrorism, maritime piracy, narcotics trafficking, pandemic disease, and disaster relief. Undersecretary of State for Political Affairs Nicholas Burns, "Indonesia the world's largest Muslim state and its third-largest democracy, is a voice of moderation in the Islamic world and plays a unique strategic role in Southeast Asia" 

In February 2005, Washington reinstated Indonesia's eligibility for the International Military Education and Training program in order to upgrade the quality of its officer corps. In May 2005, the United States removed restrictions on nonlethal defense equipment such as communications and transport systems. The latest decision lifts the last remaining barrier, a ban on sale of lethal weaponry and related equipment. Still recovering from the Asian financial crisis, the Indonesian government lacks the funds to purchase new armaments but intends to take advantage of the new rules initially to purchase spare parts for its aging fleet of 10 U.S.-supplied F-16 fighters.Invoking these accomplishments at the APEC conference, Yudhoyono argued that Indonesia has proven itself worthy of resumed military engagement with the United States. While there, he also spoke with Russian President Vladimir Putin about further defense cooperation with Moscow following Indonesia's 2003 purchase of four Sukhoi warplanes and two MI-35 assault helicopters. In addition to its dealings with the United States and Russia, Yudhoyono is considering purchasing weapons from other potential suppliers, which might include several European Union countries, South Korea, India, and China.

Economy
In managing the Indonesian economy, President Yudhoyono has made several achievements economic conditions, when he started his first term in 2004, were still marked by low  Gross domestic product and a significant shortage of infrastructure. Process of economic consolidation then began and social and security conditions became more stable after peaceful and democratic elections, he alleged. The salaries of state employees were still low while the budget for health was still limited, he added. Until this year, he indicated that the GDP and foreign exchange reserves have been increased significantly and the debt ratio to the Gross domestic product could be lowered from 56 percent to 23 percent.President SBY added that the 23 percent debt ratio to GDP was far below recorded in developed countries such as Germany (86.1 percent), United States (104.1 percent), and Great Britain (107 percent). He stated that during the period 2004-2014, the country's domestic and foreign debts could also be reduced while the national budget had increased four folds. In 2004, the country's income per capita was recorded at US$1188 but ten years later it rose to US$3490. Indonesia has also been recorded as a country with the second highest economic growth rate since 2009 after China with the country's exports increasing three folds. In the energy sector, President SBY admitted that although electricity capacity has been increased twice during his government it is still short. President Yudhoyono pointed out that the Master Plan for the Acceleration of Indonesian Economic Development (MP3EI) is a big plan and from 2011 to 2013, its projects have reached Rp828.7 trillion in value.

The second achievement was disbanding the Consultative Group on Indonesia (CGI) because he wanted Indonesia to be more independent and less dependent on many parties. President Susilo Bambang Yudhoyono said on the 24th that Indonesia would no longer seek financial aid through the Consultative Group on Indonesia (CGI), as there was no longer any need for it. He said that Indonesia no longer needed the special assistance of the CGI because the country was now able to overcome its foreign debt problems acting alone. Established in 1992, the CGI is a consortium of countries and institutions providing loans to Indonesia, set up by the Indonesian government and the World Bank. CGI membership is made up of 30 bilateral and multilateral creditors, including the World Bank, the Asian Development Bank, the International Monetary Fund and industrialized countries such as Japan and the United States, as well as many other smaller countries and many other world financial and aid institutions. In 2006 the Consultative Group on Indonesia pledged $5.4 billion in fresh loans and grants for Indonesia. Finance Minister Sri Mulyani said the Consultative Group on Indonesia (CGI) was no longer needed as the country's primary creditors were only the World Bank, the Asian Development Bank (ADB) and Japan, and that Indonesia now preferred one-on-one negotiations rather than round table, multilateral ones. She said the dissolution of the CGI was also of benefit to Indonesia as it freed the government of the need to explain its intentions and plans to many different parties. Iman Sugema, director of the International Center for Applied Finance and Economics (Inter-CAFE) at the Bogor Institute of Agriculture (IPB), applauded the president's plan to dissolve the CGI and said the CGI had not benefited Indonesia because the donor countries often put too many demands on the nation.

Social protection
Social protection is an important part that is needed by many people, therefore the Yudhoyono government is trying to implement it seriously by enacting Law Number 24 of 2011 concerning the Social Security Administering Body. The law is a government initiative to improve people's welfare through the health and employment insurance system. According to the Coordinating Minister for People's Welfare, Agung Laksono, private insurance companies need not worry about the implementation of Law Number 24 of 2011 concerning the Social Security Administering Body (BPJS),"There will still be middle to upper income groups who need their services," said Agung. The minister said the law calls for the establishment of a Social Security System which will be operated by an institution that will be formed by combining two state-owned companies, namely PT Jamsostek which provides workers' social security and PT Askes which is engaged in health insurance. The merger of the two companies is subject to a deadline set on 1 January 2014. Meanwhile, according to Suryo Bambang Sulisto, Chairman of the Indonesian Chamber of Commerce and Industry (Kadin), Indonesian entrepreneurs have accepted the law as something positive and Kadin members are ready to apply it in their companies.

In July 2005, Yudhoyono launched the Schools Operational Assistance (BOS) program. Under this arrangement, the government gives money to principals to financially assist in the running of schools. Should BOS be able to provide significant financial assistance to the school then the school is expected to lower fees or, if they are able to, to abolish fees altogether. In June 2006, Yudhoyono launched Books BOS which provides funds for the purchase of textbooks.

Other

On 17 August 2007, Indonesia by initiative of Yudhoyono in Jakarta, proposed that eight nations, homes to some 80% of the world's tropical rainforests join diplomatic ranks amid increasing concern over global warming. Indonesia led the summit of eight countries (on 24 September in New York) – Brazil, Cameroon, Congo, Costa Rica, Gabon, Indonesia, Malaysia and Papua New Guinea. On 3–15 December 2007, Indonesia hosted the 13th Conferences of the Parties (COP-13) under the United Nations Framework Convention on Climate Change (UNFCCC) in Bali.

During the Pope Benedict XVI Islam controversy, Yudhoyono stated that the Pope's comments were "unwise and inappropriate," but also that "Indonesian Muslims should have wisdom, patience, and self-restraint to address this sensitive issue....We need them so that harmony among people is not at stake."

Yudhoyono is one of the 100 World's Most Influential People in 2009 according to TIME Magazine.

During an official visit to Australia, 9–11 March 2010, he was appointed an Honorary Companion of the Order of Australia (AC) and addressed Australian Parliament, the first Indonesian head of state to do so.

Indonesian security forces claim to have uncovered a plot to murder Yudhoyono. A purported strike was to occur 17 August 2010, on Indonesian Independence Day.

Yudhoyono was made an honorary Knight Grand Cross of the Order of the Bath (GCB) by HM Queen Elizabeth II on 30 October 2012.

Political party
During his presidency, Yudhoyono further consolidated his position within the Democratic Party. In May 2005, at PD's first National Congress, Yudhoyono was elected Chairman of the Executive Board (Ketua Dewan Pembina). In this position, Yudhoyono has the highest authority, superseding that of chairman.

2014 general election
On 27 December 2012, the daily edition of The Jakarta Post hinted at a possible collaboration in Indonesia's 2014 general election between the families of Yudhoyono and former Indonesian President Megawati and their political parties, the Democratic Party and the Indonesian Democratic Party of Struggle respectively. The Constitution of Indonesia limits presidents to two terms of office, making Yudhoyono ineligible to run for a third term.

Post-presidency
After his terms as president ended, Yudhoyono remained active in politics, being reelected as leader of his party in 2015. In the 2019 presidential election, he supported Prabowo Subianto's second bid for presidency. Yudhoyono was replaced by his son Agus Harimurti Yudhoyono as the leader of the Democratic Party on 15 March 2020.

After 10 years of his presidency ended on 20 October 2014, SBY was elected as President of the Assembly and Chair of the Council of the Global Green Growth Institute for the period September 2014 to December 2016. SBY succeeded Danish prime minister (from 2009 to 2011 and since June 2015) Lars Løkke Rasmussen, the previous GGGI Council chair

He continued to live with his wife Ani until her death on 1 June 2019. In November 2021, it was announced Yudhoyono was diagnosed with early-stage prostate cancer.

Family
The name Yudhoyono is not an inherited surname; most Javanese do not have surnames. Rather, he chose it for his military name-tag, and it is how he is referred to abroad. His children and grandchildren go by the name Yudhoyono, and in formal meetings and functions he is addressed as Dr. Yudhoyono. In Indonesia, he is referred to in some media as "Susilo" and is widely known as "SBY".

During his presidency, Yudhoyono lived both in the presidential Merdeka Palace in Jakarta and at his family residence in Cikeas, Bogor with his wife, Ani Bambang Yudhoyono. First Lady Ani Yudhoyono holds a political science degree from Merdeka University, and was the first vice-chairman of her husband's Democratic Party. She is the eldest child of General (Ret.) Sarwo Edhie Wibowo, one of Indonesia's high-profile generals.

The family's eldest son, Major Agus Harimurti Yudhoyono (born 1978), graduated from Taruna Nusantara High School in 1997 and the Indonesian Military Academy in 2000 and is a holder of the Adhi Makayasa Medal like his father, continuing family tradition as the best graduate of the Military Academy. In July 2006, Agus graduated from the Institute of Defense and Strategic Studies, Singapore with a master's degree in strategic studies, and is currently studying at Harvard University. Yudhoyono gave a speech at Harvard Kennedy School in September 2009 and joked that his son became "another Harvard student working for" him – some of Yudhoyono's ministers and military generals also went to Harvard. He is married to Annisa Pohan , a fashion model and the daughter of a former Bank Indonesia vice-president. The couple's daughter, Almira Tunggadewi Yudhoyono, was born on 17 August 2008. He is currently assigned as Operations Officer of 17th Airborne Infantry Battalion.

The family's younger son, Edhie Baskoro Yudhoyono (born 1980), received his bachelor's degree in economics from the Curtin University of Technology in Perth, Western Australia and his master's degree from the Institute of Defense and Strategic Studies, Singapore. In the 2009 general election, Edhie was elected as a member of parliament from the Democratic Party and currently sits as a member of Parliament's Commission 1 dealing with international affairs. He is married to Siti Aliya Radjasa, daughter of Hatta Rajasa, one of his father's prominent Cabinet ministers. They have two sons, Airlangga Satriadhi Yudhoyono and Pancasakti Maharajasa Yudhoyono, and a daughter, Gayatari Idalia Yudhoyono.

Music/discography
Susilo Bambang Yudhoyono is a musician and in his younger days was part of a band called Gaya Teruna. In the 2000s, he has come back to his early love of music by authoring and co-authoring three pop albums.

In 2007, he released his first music album entitled My Longing for You (English title), a collection of love ballads and religious songs. The 10-song track list features some of the country's popular singers performing the songs.
In 2009, he joined forces with Yockie Suryoprayogo under the name "Yockie and Susilo" releasing the album Evolusi.
In 2010, he released a new third album entitled I'm Certain I'll Make It (English title)
In 2011, he is the producer of Afgan Syahreza's single "Kembali"

In popular culture 
 In Di Balik 98, Susilo Bambang Yudhoyono is portrayed by Pandji Pragiwaksono.
 In The Tomorrow War, Yudhoyono appears less than a second in a footage of his actual visit with the former British PM Gordon Brown on 31 March 2009, when a G20 forum was held in London. In July 2021, the Democratic Party official Herzaky Mahendra Putra said that Yudhoyono is a "protagonist" and a "deciding character".

Selected publications by Yudhoyono

Honours
National honours

Foreign Honours

References

External links

 President of Indonesia, Dr. H. Susilo Bambang Yudhoyono official government website

 New era as Susilo Bambang Yudhoyono takes office, Rachel Harvey, BBC News, 20 October 2004
 VOA News
 Profile at Tokoh Indonesia

1949 births
Candidates in the 2009 Indonesian presidential election
Democratic Party (Indonesia) politicians
Honorary Companions of the Order of Australia
Honorary Knights Grand Cross of the Order of the Bath
Indonesian Muslims
Indonesian National Military Academy alumni
Indonesian generals
Javanese people
Living people
Non-U.S. alumni of the Command and General Staff College
People from Pacitan Regency
Presidents of Indonesia
Webster University alumni
Susilo
Recipients of the Darjah Utama Temasek
Bogor Agricultural University alumni
Sepuluh Nopember Institute of Technology alumni